Beat Poetry for Survivalists is a 2020 collaborative studio album by R.E.M. co-founder Peter Buck and English musician Luke Haines. It was released on March 6, 2020 under Cherry Red Records.

Critical reception
Beat Poetry for Survivalists was met with generally favorable reviews from critics. At Metacritic, which assigns a weighted average rating out of 100 to reviews from mainstream publications, this release received an average score of 77, based on 8 reviews.

Track listing

References

2020 albums
Peter Buck albums
Luke Haines albums
Collaborative albums
Cherry Red Records albums